The Design 1003 ship (full name Emergency Fleet Corporation Design 1003) was a wood-hulled cargo ship design approved for production by the United States Shipping Boards Emergency Fleet Corporation (EFT) in World War I. They were referred to as the "Hough"-type. Most ships were completed in 1918 or 1919. Many ships were completed as barges or as hulls.

References

External links
 EFC Design 1003: Illustrations

Standard ship types of the United States